Gumprecht is a German-language given name and surname. Notable people with the name include:

Gumprecht II of Neuenahr (1400–1484)
André Gumprecht (born 1974), German footballer
Ferdinand Gumprecht (1864–1947), German internist

German-language surnames
German given names